is a Japanese Professional baseball pitcher for the Chunichi Dragons of the Nippon Professional Baseball (NPB). He previously played for the Seibu Lions / Saitama Seibu Lions, Chiba Lotte Marines and Tohoku Rakuten Golden Eagles.

Wakui pitched for the Japanese national team in the 2008 Beijing Olympics and 2009 World Baseball Classic.

His wife is a Japanese model Moe Oshikiri.

Early life and high school career

Early life
Wakui was born in Matsudo, a large city in Chiba Prefecture. He played softball in elementary school and began playing baseball in junior high for Matsudo Senior.

2002–2003
Wakui went on to Yokohama Senior High School, the alma mater of former Boston Red Sox pitcher Daisuke Matsuzaka and a baseball powerhouse that had sent more players to the pros than any other high school in Japan except PL Gakuen Senior High. There, he played in the 75th National High School Baseball Invitational Tournament in  alongside then-ace and current Chiba Lotte Marines left-hander Yoshihisa Naruse (who was a year older than Wakui) in the spring of his second year (the equivalent of eleventh grade in the United States). Wakui was chosen to start in the tournament finals despite having pitched only in relief up until then, but gave up six runs in just 3 innings to Koryo High School, who, led by current Yomiuri Giants pitcher Kentaro Nishimura, won in a 15–3 rout.

Summer 2004
In , Wakui led his team to another berth in a national tournament in his senior year, this time the 86th National High School Baseball Championship held in the summer at Koshien Stadium. However, he was no match for Komazawa University Tomakomai High School in the quarter-finals, giving up 14 hits and six runs (five earned) and allowing second baseman Yuya Hayashi to hit for the cycle en route to a 6–1 loss.

Fall 2004
In the Sainokuni Magokoro National Sports Festival held that fall, the last national tournament of his high school career, Wakui avenged his earlier loss against Tomakomai High by pitching a 14-strikeout complete game win in the first round. Yokohama Senior High went on to become the tournament champions.

Seibu Lions / Saitama Seibu Lions
Wakui was picked in the first round of the  NPB amateur draft by the Seibu Lions and later given the uniform number 16. His repertoire at the time included a  fastball and a hard slider.

Wakui was named to the Lions' ichigun (Japanese equivalent of "major league") roster for their season opener in his rookie season, earning the first win of his professional career on June 18 in the last interleague game of the season against the Yakult Swallows. However, he finished the year with just a 1–6 record and a 7.32 ERA, giving up 11 home runs in 55 innings.

The two combined for another win on April 23 against the Tohoku Rakuten Golden Eagles, the first complete game win as well as the first shutout of Wakui's career.

Wakui finished his sophomore season with a respectable 12–8 record, 3.24 ERA and 136 strikeouts in 178 innings pitched. He went 3–1 in June, earning Pacific League Most Valuable Player honors for that month, and made his first All-Star Game appearance via manager selection.

On April 3, in the fifth inning of a regular season game against the Fukuoka SoftBank Hawks, Wakui became just the 12th pitcher in NPB history to accomplish the unusual feat of striking out four batters in one inning.

He finished the season with a 17–10 record, leading the league in wins for the first time. He also led both Pacific and Central leagues in innings pitched (213) and hits allowed (199) and came second to only Hokkaido Nippon-Ham Fighters ace Yu Darvish in complete games (11).

That year, Wakui was named to the Japanese national team to play in the 2007 Asian Baseball Championship (which also functioned as the Asian qualifying tournament for the 2008 Beijing Olympics). He and fellow 21-year-old Darvish, who had both been chosen to the national team for the first time, were the youngest members of the team. Wakui started in the Japan's first game against the Philippines and held them to just one hit over six shutout innings (Japan won the game 10–0 in seven innings as per the mercy rule).

In , Wakui was named the starter for the Lions' season opener for the first time in his career. He took the mound in their season opener against the Buffaloes on March 20, but incurred the loss despite throwing 140 pitches and holding the Buffaloes to two runs over eight innings.

Wakui was selected to the national team to play in the Olympics, starting in the game against Chinese Taipei in the group stage on August 14 and holding them to one run over six innings in earning the win. He followed up the effort with a two-hit, complete game (seven innings due to mercy rule) shutout against China on August 19. However, he had a down year overall, going just 10–11 in the regular season and posting an ERA (3.90) and WHIP (1.29) that were both worse than that of his 2007 season.

Nevertheless, Wakui took the hill in Game 1 and Game 5 of the Pacific League Climax Series (playoffs) against the Fighters, winning both starts and giving up just one run over 15 combined innings. In particular, he did not allow a single baserunner until two outs in the seventh inning in the latter game, finishing with a three-hit, complete game shutout and clinching a berth in the Japan Series for the Lions. He was named the Pacific League Climax Series MVP. He pitched in three games in the Japan Series, starting Game 1 and Game 5 and even coming on in relief in Game 7 on two days' rest to a key role in the Lions' championship (though he gave up six runs in 16 innings).

Wakui accepted the team's offer to change his uniform number from 16 to 18 during the off-season, a number that denotes the team's ace pitcher in Japan.

Wakui was named to the national team to play in the 2009 World Baseball Classic. He pitched in three games as a middle reliever, going 1–0 with a 2.70 ERA and contributing to Japan's second consecutive tournament title. He carried over his performance into the  regular season, going 3–1 with a 2.10 ERA in the month of April. In particular, he held the Marines to one run while going the distance in a 12-strikeout, complete game win on April 24, striking out every batter in the Marines' lineup at least once and recording at least one strikeout in every inning (the first time in league history that a pitcher had accomplished the two feats in the same game). He allowed just four hits en route to his first complete game shutout in two years on May 15 against the Marines.

Chiba Lotte Marines

Tohoku Rakuten Golden Eagles
On December 19, 2019, the Marines traded Wakui to the Tohoku Rakuten Golden Eagles for cash. On December 23, 2019, the team held a press conference announcing his signing.

Pitching style
Wakui is a 185 cm (6 ft 1 in),  right-handed pitcher with a three-quarters delivery. While his mechanics are well-balanced and mostly conventional, one unique trait in his delivery is how he completely straightens his left leg in a diagonal direction after raising it (and before dropping and driving towards the plate).

However, he complements it with a wide assortment of secondary pitches, including a slider, cutter, curveball, splitter, changeup, and a solid shuuto (two-seamer/sinker). He also has decent command, posting a BB/9 (walks per nine innings rate) of 2.7 in his NPB career.

References

External links

Career statistics - NPB.jp

1986 births
Living people
Baseball players at the 2008 Summer Olympics
Baseball people from Chiba Prefecture
Chiba Lotte Marines players
Olympic baseball players of Japan
Nippon Professional Baseball pitchers
People from Matsudo
Saitama Seibu Lions players
Seibu Lions players
Tohoku Rakuten Golden Eagles players
Chunichi Dragons players
2009 World Baseball Classic players
2013 World Baseball Classic players